Spodnja Senarska is a village in the Municipality of Sveta Trojica v Slovenskih Goricah in northeastern Slovenia. It lies on the edge of the Pesnica Valley. The area is part of the traditional region of Styria and is now included in the Drava Statistical Region.

Archaeological evidence points to Roman-era settlement of the area with burial mounds and remains of other contemporary structures.

References

External links
Spodnja Senarska at Geopedia

Populated places in the Municipality of Sveta Trojica v Slovenskih Goricah